Jiangzhe may refer to:

 Wu (region) or Jiangzhe (江浙), a region in the Jiangnan area
 Jiangzhe people, often synonymous with Wu Chinese-speaking people
 Jiangzhe province (江浙行省) during the Yuan dynasty
 Jiang Zhe, a Chinese football player

See also
 Zhejiang